"Ethiopia" is a song by Ethiopian singer-songwriter Teddy Afro from the album of the same name. Released on 2 May 2017, the song reached the top of the Billboard World Albums chart in that month, at which time more than 600,000 units had been sold.

Live performance
On 3 September 2017, Teddy Afro's Ethiopia concert was halted by police forces on the grounds of government-sponsored event was taking place. Teddy Afro cancelled after apparent announcement of the government.

References

2017 singles
Teddy Afro songs
2017 songs